Lily Berglund (Kvarnsveden, 21 July 1928 – Stockholm, 15 August 2010) was a Swedish singer. She was married to Kapellmeister Göte Wilhelmson.

Discography
Aftonklockor (Evening Chimes) – Dick Harris stora orkester
Bär du solsken i ditt sinne – Göte Wilhelmsons orkester
Det är dags för en kyss – Gunnar Wiklund – Dick Harris orkester
Du är som alla andra (Du bist wie alle anderen) – Willard Ringstrands hammondens 
I denna stund (I Need You) –  Simon Brehms orkester
Botch-a-me – Carl Holmberg – Gösta Theselius Butcher Boys 
Ensam går jag vilse (Can't I) – Knut Edgardts orkester 
Följ med mej (Be my life's companion) – Emil Iwrings orkester 
När vi möts – vi möts i dans (Till I waltz again with you) – Gunnar Svenssons orkester

Filmography
1952 – Bom the Flyer 
1954 – Thore Ehrling
1955 – My Passionate Longing

References

Death notice – SVT

Further reading 
 

1928 births
2010 deaths
Melodifestivalen contestants
20th-century Swedish women singers